Raute Corporation is a Finnish company. It is the parent company of the globally operating Raute Group, which manufactures machines for the production of veneer, plywood and LVL panels and beams.

According to market assessments, Raute has been the biggest global supplier of mill-scale plywood and LVL projects for years – also in 2019. Raute’s predecessor Lahden Rauta- ja Metalliteollisuustehdas was established in 1908 and the current name was taken into use in 1983. Raute’s majority shareholders are the Mustakallio family who have been part of the company’s operations almost from the beginning. The company’s registered office is in Lahti, Finland.

History

Lahden Rauta- ja Metalliteollisuustehdas Osakeyhtiö (1908–1912) 
In 1908, the manufacturer P. Kuivalainen founded an engineering works that repaired machines and manufactured iron bedframes. From 1911, the company was led by Henrik Schwartzberg.

Lahden Rautateollisuus Osakeyhtiö (1912–1942) 
With Schwartzberg at the helm, the engineering works became profitable. When wooden beds supplanted iron ones in Finland, the company began manufacturing weighing scales in 1914. Lahden Vaaka produced scales for households and stores. The engineering works made inland waterway vessels, boilers and steam engines.

The company’s first foreign transactions took place on its so-called internal market in 1914–1917 when it sold metal lathes and wood processing machinery to Russia. In the early years of Finland’s independence, Schwartzberg and his family acquired the majority of the shares in the company.

In the 1930s, the company began manufacturing frame saws, scales and plywood machines. The first veneer lathe was manufactured in 1931.

In the later 1930s, Aarne Mustakallio and his brother Pauli Mustakallio continued at the helm of Lahden Rautateollisuus Oy, following in the footsteps of their father Henrik Schwartzberg. Even before the Winter War broke out, the company was classified as major industry and a significant share of its production was exported.

Lahden Rautateollisuus Oy (1942–1983) 
Following the Second World War and ensuing war reparations manufacturing, with Aarne Mustakallio at the helm, the company became a successful exporter, known especially as a manufacturer of mechanical wood processing machinery and plants. In the 1940s, the company served the armaments industry. The product selection of Lahden Rautateollisuus had long included scales and a subsidiary by the name of Lahden Vaaka Oy was established in 1943 for furthering their manufacture.

After the war, Lahden Rautateollisuus participated in war reparations manufacture. By 1952, Raute had supplied 1,200 machines as war reparations to the Soviet Union.

After the war reparations were delivered, the Soviet Union made some major orders and signed long-term contracts with the company. As a result, President and CEO Mustakallio was able to develop the plants’ production and restore the pre-war export contacts with the rest of the world. Around one third of Lahden Rautateollisuus’s production was exported. In the 1950s, Sopekaluste Oy was established to market furniture.

In 1959, Lahden Vaaka Oy, Sopenkorpi Oy and Mustakallio Oy were merged with the parent company Lahden Rautateollisuus.

The company invested relatively early on in automation, in the 1960s when the first automated production lines were built, including one for the Pellos plywood mill in Ristiina.

In 1968, the first factory and warehouse complex was completed in Nastola, featuring plywood and chipboard pressing lines. Aarne Mustakallio headed the company until he passed away, after which Aarne’s younger brother Heikki Mustakallio, who had been Managing Director of Lahden Vaaka Oy, among other things, was appointed as his successor.

A foundation was laid for the delivery of mill-scale projects in the 1960s and 1970s, when the traditional lathe manufacturer supplying individual machines and machine lines adjusted its strategy. One of the first major deals was the Bratsk plywood mill in the Soviet Union, completed in 1970.

In 1975, Lahden Rautateollisuus carried out two M&As. Oy Infor Ab, a company manufacturing downstream devices for panel mill production lines, was acquired from Nastola, complementing the company’s own production. Enwe Oy from Lahti was merged with the company and at the same time Enwe Oy’s furniture factory in Nastola was merged with the Sopenkorpi furniture factory owned by the Mustakallio family.

Raute Oy (1983–1998) 
In 1983, Lahden Rautateollisuus Oy became Raute Oy.

In the 1990s, the entire production of the wood processing machinery business was transferred to Nastola.

Heikki Mustakallio focused on the company’s marketing, product development and exports, forging a globally relevant plywood and panel industry machine and production line manufacturer. In order to consolidate the company’s position on the global markets, Mustakallio took active part in the metal industry’s export organization Metex, established subsidiaries in North and South America and created an agent network in the company’s key export countries. Under his wing, Raute Oy also extensively engaged in corporate philanthropy and supported several cultural and war veteran organizations and institutions. Heikki Mustakallio’s term as President and CEO lasted from 1970 to 1985, when he became full-time Chairman of the Board of Directors. For the first time in close to 75 years, the President and CEO of the company was appointed from outside the family. In 1987, Mustakallio took over as Chairman of the Supervisory Board, which position he held until 1992.

The fall of the Soviet Union was a tough time for the company. Exports to Russia and the former Soviet states were, however, restored within a few years. Tough restructuring measures helped Raute Oy pull through and in 1992 the company was demerged again. The company included Raute Oy, Raute Wood Processing Machinery Oy and Raute Precision Oy, as well as the Group’s Finnish subsidiary RWS-Engineering Oy. The furniture manufacturer Sope/Sopenkorpi Oy was closed down in 1994. The same year, Raute was listed on the stock exchange in Helsinki.

Raute’s major clients in the 1990s included the world’s largest glass manufacturer Saint-Gobain, to whose factories in India, the UK, Poland and the Czech Republic Raute Precision supplied raw material systems, and Roseburg Forest Products from Oregon, USA, for which Raute Wood manufactured an LVL production line for gluing peeled veneers into wooden beams.

In 1995, the Chairman of the company’s Board of Directors, Juha-Pekka Keskiaho, was appointed as President and CEO. He was a Mustakallio on his mother’s side. Keskiaho continued to expand the company globally, rationalized its business and came up with new applications for the company’s sizable real estate holdings, for which the company had no use.

Raute Corporation (1998–2009) 
Raute Group’s net sales in 1998 were 688 million Finnish markka and its profit came to 38 million. Raute Precision, which made weighing equipment, traded in North and South America, among other places. Risto Mäkitalo took over the reins as Raute’s President and CEO.

In 2003, Raute Precision was among the top two raw material plant suppliers for the glass industry in the world and the third largest supplier of plants to the plaster and filler industry. In Finland, it was the leading company in the weighing equipment sector. In February 2004, Raute Group sold Raute Precision. The profits from the transaction, approximately two million euros, was used to develop the Raute Wood business group.

Tapani Kiiski was appointed as Raute’s President and CEO in 2004.

In 2007, around half of the world’s LVL production took place on Raute’s machines.

The 2008 financial crisis caused the company’s order book to plummet and its net sales fell from close to EUR 100 million to EUR 37 million and the result was negative. Raute survived the difficult years due to its strong balance sheet and personnel restructuring, such as through temporary layoffs. Large-scale terminations were avoided as subcontracting was reduced.

Raute Corporation (2010–present) 
Raute’s largest orders in the early 2010s included EUR 12 million in production line modernizations for the Russian plywood company Brjanskij Fanernyi Kombinat in summer 2010, veneer peeling lines and plywood gluing and pressing lines worth EUR 16 million, which it supplied to CMPC Maderas in Chile in 2012, and a EUR 14 million order for Pollmeier Furnierwerkstoffe for the LVL mill it built in Creuzburg in 2012. In 2012, Raute received its largest ever order when the Chilean Paneles Araucon plywood mill in Neuva Aldea burned down and had to be rebuilt. The value of the transaction was more than EUR 50 million.

In 2014, Raute received a machine and equipment order from Steico Spolka worth EUR 23 million for a new Laminated Veneer Lumber mill in Czarna Woda. Exports accounted for around 94 percent of production, net sales came to EUR 94 million and the number of employees was 600, of which 400 worked in Finland.

While the rest of the wood products industry was floundering in 2015, Raute had to ramp up its production from two to three shifts at its Nastola plant to meet all of its orders. It had received a record number of new orders at the start of the year, five times that of the previous year. For example, Stora Enso ordered an LVL line worth EUR 30 million from Raute for its mill in Varkaus, Latvijas Finieris ordered a EUR 31 million veneer mill expansion for Estonia and UPM Plywood made an order worth EUR 13 million for its mill in Otepää, Estonia.

In 2016, Raute received a machine and equipment order worth EUR 25 million from Metsä Wood for its production facilities manufacturing veneer in Lohja and Äänekoski. The Russian company Vyatskiy Fanernyi Kombinat made an order worth EUR 32 million for the expansion of its mill located in the Kirov Oblast.

In spring 2017, Raute acquired the company Metriguard in Pullman in the United States. Metriguard supplied measuring devices for the veneer and plywood industry. In October, UPM made an order worth EUR 21 million for the expansion of its birch plywood mill in Chudovo, Russia, and Roseburg Forest Products, located in Roseburg, Oregon, ordered an LVL layup line worth more than EUR 11 million.

In January 2018, Metsä Group ordered EUR 23 million in lines for the expansion of its LVL mill in Punkaharju and related services. Raute made its highest ever net sales, EUR 181 million, of which EUR 15 million was operating profit. It rewarded its employees with raises that exceeded the amount specified in the collective labor agreement and with a week’s worth of additional wages. The company was suffering from a lack of workforce and by rewarding the personnel, it hoped to impact its employer image.

In September 2019, Raute revamped its management structure to better correspond with customer needs. In October, Raute reported that it received its largest ever individual order. Segezha Group from Russia ordered all of the machines and equipment for its new plywood mill to be built in the village of Galich in Kostroma Oblast. The value of the transaction was EUR 58 million.

Products 
Raute supplies machines for the production of veneer, plywood and LVL panels and beams. Raute’s technology services include equipment maintenance, modernizations and spare parts, training, development of the customer’s business and digital services. Its automation products include, for example, PLC, lasers and ultrasound measurement.

Markets 
Raute is the market leader of mill-scale projects for plywood and veneer. It is the world’s only company that can sell an entire plywood mill, from log handling to the further processing of panels. The company’s competitors are smaller and more regional operators specialized in only a part of the process. For instance, the Japanese company Hashimoto is bigger than Raute when it comes to veneer jointing. Raute’s biggest competitor is the Japanese Meinan, whose net sales in 2014 were less than half of Raute’s. The company’s business is exceptionally sensitive to economic cycles, which can be explained, for example, by the fact that plywood’s global production rose 85 percent between 2000 and 2017 and LVL production increased 57 percent between 2011 and 2017. In 2019, around half of the world’s LVL was manufactured on machines made by Raute.

Raute’s net sales in 2019 totaled around EUR 151.3 million. Its largest markets were in Europe (34%), Russia (31%) and North America (18%). South America’s share was nine percent and the Asia-Pacific area made up eight percent. China is the world’s largest producer of plywood, while the USA is the leader in the LVL markets.

Organization 
The Finnish Raute Corporation is the parent company of Raute Group. It includes the head office in the Nastola area of Lahti and a manufacturing and engineering unit specializing in machine vision and moisture measurement technology in Kajaani. In 2019, the parent company Raute Corporation made up 80 percent of the Group’s net sales. Converted to full-time employees (“effective headcount”), the number of employees was 778 in 2019.

In 2019, the Group included eight foreign subsidiaries:

 the production units are located in
 Canada (Vancouver area)
 China (Shanghai area) and
 the USA, Pullman, Washington
 Customer and maintenance services are also offered in
 Russia, St. Petersburg
 Chile, Santiago and
 Singapore

In addition to these, the company also has a network of agents and local service points.

In 2019, project deliveries made up 57 percent of net sales and technology services 43 percent. The plywood industry’s share of the net sales of project deliveries was 85 percent, while the LVL industry’s share was 15 percent.

Shares and owners 
Raute’s main owner is the Mustakallio family, which has been involved in the company’s operations for more than a century, and whose share of the votes is more than half. In the 1950s, the company’s holdings were divided up between fewer than ten family members. The Group’s Articles of Association have a redemption clause according to which the descendants of Henrik Schwartzberg are preferred owners. In the late 1970s, the company had fewer than 30 owners. Today, there are more than fifty family owners with ordinary shares.

The company’s A series share is listed on Nasdaq Helsinki. On 30 April 2020, the largest owners were (% of shares):

 Göran Sundholm (11.7%)
 Mandatum Life Insurance Company Unit-Linked (3.2%)
 Mikko Laakkonen (2.8%)
 Pekka Suominen (2.6%)
 Osku Siivonen (2.4%)

Raute in literature 
 has used Raute’s story is his crime fiction books, for example ‘Mustamäki’. Two historical accounts of Raute have also been written, ‘Tarinoita Rautesta’ authored by Laura Visapää in 1997 and ‘Raute 1908-1998’, by Sinikka Mustakallio and Brian Fleming, published in 1998.

References

External links 
 

Companies listed on Nasdaq Helsinki
Machine manufacturers
Pages with unreviewed translations
Technology companies of Finland
Companies established in 1908
Lahti